Eupoecilia ambiguella, the vine moth, is a moth of the family Tortricidae. It is found in Europe, China (Anhui, Fujian, Gansu, Guizhou, Hebei, Heilongjiang, Henan, Hubei, Hunan, Jiangxi, Shaanxi, Shanxi, Sichuan, Tianjin, Xinjiang, Yunnan, Zhejiang), India, Japan, Korea, Mongolia and the Russian Far East.

The wingspan is 12–15 mm. The moth flies from May to August.

The larvae mainly feed on dogwood, Rhamnus frangula, Hedera helix, Rhamnus cathartica, grape and honeysuckle. The species is considered a pest for grapes.

References

External links 
 Vine moth at UKmoths
 Lepiforum.de

Eupoecilia
Moths described in 1796
Grape pest insects
Moths of Japan
Tortricidae of Europe
Insects of Turkey
Taxa named by Jacob Hübner